Manuel Jiménez Nolasco (born April 23, 1992, in Veracruz City) is a Mexican professional footballer who last played for Ocelotes UNACH.

Jiménez made his professional debut with San Luis on 29 April 2012, coming on for Aníbal Matellán during a 2–1 Liga MX loss to Toluca.

References

External links
 

Living people
1992 births
Mexican footballers
Association football defenders
San Luis F.C. players
Chiapas F.C. footballers
Lobos BUAP footballers
Potros UAEM footballers
Ocelotes UNACH footballers
Liga MX players
Liga Premier de México players
Footballers from Veracruz
People from Veracruz (city)